The Faliro Sports Pavilion Arena which is part of the Faliro Coastal Zone Olympic Complex is an indoor arena in Palaio Faliro, in Athens, Greece. It is nicknamed "The Little Peace And Friendship Stadium", due to its similarity in design and close proximity to the Peace and Friendship Stadium.

It was the site of the 2004 Athens Summer Olympics preliminary matches of handball, as well as the taekwondo competition. The arena seats 8,536 for handball matches of 2004 Olympics, though only 3,836 seats were made publicly available during the Olympics.

History
The arena was completed on December 20, 2003, and it officially opened on August 12, 2004, shortly before the 2004 Olympics began. In June 2010, the arena hosted the 7th MAD Video Music Awards, held by Mad TV, and hosted by Themis Georgantas. The Prodigy had a sold-out concert event at the arena. Tiesto performed at the arena, during his Kaleidoscope World Tour. The arena is also known as a long-time venue for Holiday on Ice shows. It also hosted the Greek Legends event by Riot Games, a League of Legends LAN tournament on June 28 and 29, 2014.

It hosted the finals of the League of Legends Greek Championship Season 1 in the 28th and 29 January 2017, co-organized by Riot Games, AST, and inSpot.

See also
List of indoor arenas in Greece

References

External links

2004 Summer Olympics official report. Volume 2. pp. 349, 403.
Olympicproperties.gr profile. 
Faliro Arena @ Stadia.gr

Sports venues completed in 2004
2004 establishments in Greece
Faliro Coastal Zone Olympic Complex
Indoor arenas in Greece
Olympic handball venues
Olympic taekwondo venues
Sports venues in Athens
Handball venues in Greece
Basketball venues in Greece
Volleyball venues in Greece
Venues of the 2004 Summer Olympics